Thea Bowman Leadership Academy is a K-12 charter school in Gary, Indiana. It is authorized by Ball State University, was established by the Drexel Foundation for Educational Excellence, Inc., and is managed by American Quality Schools, Inc.

The school is named after Sr Thea Bowman, who was an African-American Catholic nun, teacher, and scholar in the 20th century.

History
Thea Bowman Leadership Academy first opened as a K-6 charter school on August 18, 2003. With each passing year, Bowman Academy added an additional grade level. As of the 2009–2010 academic year, the school had expanded its program to accommodate all thirteen grade levels, from kindergarten through 12th grade. Students who entered the program as 6th graders in August 2003 comprised the school's first class of graduating high school seniors in June 2010. 
 
The K-6 Thea Bowman Leadership Academy occupies the building that once housed Holy Angels School, a Catholic school associated with the adjacent Cathedral of the Holy Angels, which is the seat of the Diocese of Gary. The current building opened in 1966 as Holy Angels School, and was renamed in 1994 as Sister Thea Bowman School, but was ultimately closed in 2002. The current school is in no way affiliated with the cathedral or the diocese.

In 2008, Bowman Academy began construction on a new building to accommodate students in grades 7 through 12. The new Thea Bowman Leadership Academy High School was dedicated on April 23, 2009, and is fully operational for the 2009–2010 academic year.

Athletics
During the 2010–2011 school year, Thea Bowman Leadership Academy's boys basketball team won the Class 1A State championship, in only its 2nd year of tournament play.

See also
 List of high schools in Indiana

References
      5.   State of Indiana Teacher Licensing Department (Indiana Department of Education)

External links
Thea Bowman Leadership Academy (K-6) Official Site
Thea Bowman Leadership Academy Jr.-Sr. High School (7-12) Official Site
The Drexel Foundation for Educational Excellence, Inc. Official Site
American Quality Schools, Inc. Official Site
School Snapshot by the Indiana Department of Education

Schools in Gary, Indiana
Charter schools in Indiana
Public high schools in Indiana
Public middle schools in Indiana
Public elementary schools in Indiana
2003 establishments in Indiana